Burundi Airlines  is a state-owned national airline of Burundi, to function as the national carrier of that East African country. The government of Burundi owns 92 percent of the new airline's stock. Burundi Airlines was formally established on 4 February 2021.

Overview
The new airline is a merger of the defunct Air Burundi, which ceased operations in 2009, and SOBUGEA, a Burundian government-owned company responsible for ground handling and airport maintenance. The new combined entity will own 92 percent of Burundi Airlines stock. The remaining 8 percent shareholding will be split between a Belgian company and the state-owned insurance company, Societe d’Assurances du Burundi (Socabu).

Ownership
The table below illustrates the shareholding in the stock of Burundi Airlines, as of February 2021.

History
The former national carrier, Air Burundi was established in 1971, began operations in 1975 and ceased operations in 2009. As part of previous attempts at revival of Air Burundi, the matter came up for discussion during a Cabinet of Burundi meeting on 26 May 2020.

When the matter came up again in a cabinet meeting on 28 December 2020, a decision was made to merge Air Burundi assets, with those of SOBUGEA to constitute the government's 92 percent contribution to the new Burundi Airlines. Other shareholders include the state-owned insurer, Société d’Assurances du Burundi (SOCABU) and the estate of the defunct Belgian airline, SABENA.

Fleet
In 2012 the defunct Air Burundi took delivery of a Xian MA60, 52-seater, two-engine turboprop aircraft. Under arrangement with the manufacturers, another similar aircraft was due to be delivered later. The new Burundi Airlines is expected to begin service with those two airplanes. More aircraft will be acquired as need arises, going forward.

See also

Transport in Burundi

References

External links
 Why flying within East Africa is cumbersome As of 7 February 2018.

Airlines of Burundi
Airlines established in 2021
Bujumbura
Government-owned airlines
Burundian companies established in 2021